Noel Hodda (born 1954) is an Australian actor, writer, dramaturge, director and teacher.

Acting career
Hodda was a founding member of the Riverina Theatre Company, located in Wagga Wagga and Project TYER, a Theatre In Education Co., for whom he also wrote and appeared in the play Strata Digger. Subsequently, he graduated from the National Institute of Dramatic Art (NIDA) at the UNSW Sydney and then worked as an actor for the Sydney Theatre Company, the Queensland Theatre Company, the Griffin Theatre Company, the Ensemble Theatre, the Q Theatre, Marian Street Theatre, Sport for Jove at the Seymour Centre and others. He  also performed in major national and international tours, including The Removalists, Are You Lonesome Tonight, The Club, The Life Of Galileo, Chasing The Dragon, Diving For Pearls and Dinner.

He has appeared in numerous Australian television series and tele-dramas as both a lead and guest character, including continuing roles in the dramas Sons and Daughters (as regular Rob Keegan from 1982–84), E Street (as celebrity TV doctor David Fielding from 1989–91) and Out of the Blue. Hodda has had guest roles in Neighbours, Janet King and Rake.

His film appearances include Emoh Ruo, The Highest Honour (aka Heroes Of The Krait/Southern Cross), Silver City, A Step in the Right Direction and The Bet, among others.

Stage writer
Hodda has written and staged numerous plays including: The Secret House, Half Safe, Photographs, and On The Public Record. His play Later was chosen to be workshopped at the prestigious Banff playRites Colony, Banff, Canada, in 2004. His television writing credits include episodes of the ABC TV G.P. drama.

Directing and teaching career
Hodda was a board member and Chairman of the Board of the Griffin Theatre Co. and a member of that company's Literary Committee. Currently, he still acts, directs and teaches. He was a long-standing narrator for Vision Australia and won the National Library Talking Book Award for his narration of the novel Cold Mountain.

He assesses plays for Page To Stage (a young Playwright's organisation) and Parnassus' Den. He has also been a script assessor for the Australia Council for the Arts, The Australian National Playwright's Centre and Belvoir Street Theatre and has conducted acting and writing workshops for many organisations. He has been Artist-In-Residence at Charles Sturt University, Wagga Wagga, and has also taught acting and voice there on short-term appointments, as well as at the University of Wollongong School of Performing Arts.

His dramaturgical work on the play Codgers by Don Reid contributed to that play winning the prestigious Rodney Seaborn Playwright's Award in 2006.

References

External links
 

Australian male television actors
People from Albury, New South Wales
University of New South Wales alumni
1954 births
Living people
Dramaturges